Huilo-Huilo sometimes stylized: Huilo Hulio may refer to:

Huilo-Huilo Biological Reserve
Huilo-Huilo Falls
A Mapudungun word